Botanical gardens in Belgium have collections consisting entirely of Belgium native and endemic species; most have a collection that include plants from around the world. There are botanical gardens and arboreta in all states and territories of Belgium, most are administered by local governments, some are privately owned.
 Antwerp Botanic Garden
 Bokrijk Arboretum
 Botanical Garden of Brussels
 Ghent University Botanic Garden
 Arboretum Kalmthout – Kalmthout
 Hortus Botanicus Lovaniensis – Leuven
 Botanical Garden of Mechelen
 Botanic Garden Meise
 Arboretum Wespelaar
 Arboretum Provinciaal Domein Het Leen

References 

Belgium
Botanical gardens